Nelson Stone (born 2 June 1984) is a Papua New Guinean runner. He competed in the 400 m event at the 2012 Summer Olympics but was eliminated in the first round despite setting a season's best time of 46.71.

Personal bests

Achievements 

1: Did not show in the final.

References

External links

Sports reference biography

Papua New Guinean male sprinters
Olympic athletes of Papua New Guinea
1984 births
Athletes (track and field) at the 2012 Summer Olympics
Living people
People from Central Province (Papua New Guinea)
Athletes (track and field) at the 2010 Commonwealth Games
Athletes (track and field) at the 2014 Commonwealth Games
Commonwealth Games competitors for Papua New Guinea
World Athletics Championships athletes for Papua New Guinea
Oceanian Athletics Championships winners